Allensville is a census-designated place (CDP) in  Menno Township, Mifflin County, Pennsylvania, United States.

Further reading
 Darby, William and Dwight, Theodore Jr. (1833). A new Gazetteer of the United States of America. Harford, Edward Hopkins. 630p., map.

External links
 

Census-designated places in Mifflin County, Pennsylvania
Census-designated places in Pennsylvania